Keelavannippattu is a village in the Orathanadu taluk of Thanjavur district, Tamil Nadu, India.

Demographics 

As per the 2001 census, Kelavannipet had a total population of 1983 with 954 males and 1029 females. The sex ratio was 1079. The literacy rate was 63.19.

References 

 

Villages in Thanjavur district